Patricia Marcantonio is an American novelist and short story writer. She is the author of the Felicity Carrol mystery series and an award-winning collection of short stories, Red Ridin' in the Hood and Other Cuentos.

Background 

She was born in Pueblo, Colorado, the granddaughter of Mexican immigrants. She earned a B.S. degree in mass communications from Colorado State University Pueblo and formerly worked as a crime and trial reporter. She now lives in Idaho.

Books 
 Under the Blood Moon (Dark Ink)
 Felicity Carrol and the Murderous Menace (Crooked Lane Books, 2020)
 Felicity Carrol and the Perilous Pursuit (Crooked Lane Books, 2019)
 Verdict in the Desert (Arte Público, 2016)
 Billie Neville Takes a Leap (River St. Press, 2014)
 Sueno Street (2017) Illustrated by Mike Youngman
 The Weeping Woman (Mesa Books, 2021)
 The Ghost Sisters and the Girl in Hallway B (Mesa Books, 2016)
 Hauntings from the Snake River Plain (Anthology; River St. Press, 2012)
 Voices from the Snake River Plain (Anthology; River St. Press, 2009)
 Red Ridin' in the Hood and Other Cuentos (Farrar, Straus and Giroux, 2005)
 On Holy Ground: The History, Art and Faith of St. Edward the Confessor Roman Catholic Church, Twin Falls, Idaho ( 2003)

 Plays Roja Ridin' in the Hood and Other Tales (Pioneer Drama Service)
Starring Jane Eyre
Tears for Llorona

Awards and honors 

Her Victorian mystery novel, Felicity Carrol and the Perilous Pursuit, is the first of a series and has received favorable reviews from the Historical Novel Society, Publishers Weekly, Kirkus Reviews, and the New York Journal of Books.

Her courtroom drama, Verdict in the Desert, was included in Amazon's Latino Best Seller List and the 2016 Latina Book Club Books of the Year, and was favorably reviewed by Kirkus Reviews. Also in 2016, she was featured as Author of the Month on Houston Public Media.

Her short story collection, Red Ridin' in the Hood and Other Cuentos, received the Anne Izard Storytellers' Choice Award, an Américas Award for Children's and Young Adult Literature (Commended Title), and recommendations from Publishers Weekly, the National Council of Teachers of English, and the Bulletin of the Center for Children's Books. It was included in "50 Multicultural Books Every Child Should Know" by the Cooperative Children's Book Center (CCBC) at the University of Wisconsin–Madison School of Education and in "Exceptional Anthologies and Short Story Collections" by the All the Wonders podcast.

She has also won several screenplay and short story contests.

References

External links 
 
 15 things you may not know about Patricia Marcantonio by Bonnie Dodge

People from Pueblo, Colorado
Writers from Colorado
Writers from Idaho
Colorado State University Pueblo alumni
American writers of Mexican descent
American women novelists
American women short story writers
American mystery novelists
Hispanic and Latino American novelists
Year of birth missing (living people)
Living people
21st-century American women